Norman Brooks Roy III (November 15, 1928 – March 22, 2011) was a Major League Baseball pitcher.

Roy was born in Newton, Massachusetts, and grew up in Waltham, where he attended Waltham High School. He was signed by the Boston Braves in 1947, and spent four years with Class-B Pawtucket Slaters (1947) and AAA Milwaukee Brewers (1948–49, 1951) before joining the Braves in the 1950 season.

Roy posted a 4–3 record and a 5.13 ERA in 19 appearances for the Braves, including six starts, two complete games and one save. He allowed 38 runs (34 earned) on 72 hits and 39 walks while striking out 25 in 59 innings of work.

Roy later returned to the Brewers (1951) and also played for AA Atlanta Crackers (1952). After that he developed severe pitching arm problems and was unable to continue his career. He went 27–15 with a 3.52 ERA in 70 minor league games.

Following his retirement, Roy was employed with Raytheon Company for more than 38 years at both the Bedford and Tewksbury locations.

Normie Roy died in Nashua, New Hampshire, at the age of 82, following a brief illness.

See also
1950 Boston Braves season

References

External links

1928 births
2011 deaths
Atlanta Crackers players
Baseball players from Massachusetts
Boston Braves players
Major League Baseball pitchers
Milwaukee Brewers (minor league) players
Pawtucket Slaters players
Sportspeople from Newton, Massachusetts
Waltham High School alumni